Cedar Creek is a stream in Ripley County in the U.S. state of Missouri. It is a tributary of the Current River.

Cedar Creek was so named on account of cedar timber in the area.

See also
List of rivers of Missouri

References

Rivers of Ripley County, Missouri
Rivers of Missouri